The Winagami sill complex, also called the Winagami sills, is a Paleoproterozoic large igneous province of northwestern Alberta, Canada. It consists of a series of related sills that were formed between 1.89 and 1.76 billion years ago.

References

Large igneous provinces
Igneous petrology of Alberta
Paleoproterozoic magmatism
Sills (geology)